Charlie Drake is a British comedy television showed which aired on the BBC from 1958 and 1960. It starred the comedian Charlie Drake in a series of stand alone half-hour shows, sometimes billed as Charlie Drake In.... It was followed by The Charlie Drake Show.

Cast
Drake was the only performer who appeared in all twenty two episodes, but a number of other actors made guest appearances including Sam Kydd, Patricia Bredin, Howard Lang, Michael Balfour, Ian Fleming, Jocelyn Lane, Denis Shaw, Geoffrey Sumner, Diane Clare, Ann Firbank, Hugh Lloyd, Gibb McLaughlin, Beatrice Varley, Rita Webb, Tutte Lemkow and Sandra Dorne.

References

Bibliography
 Vahimagi, Tise . British Television: An Illustrated Guide. Oxford University Press, 1996.

External links
 

1958 British television series debuts
1960 British television series endings
1950s British comedy television series
1960s British comedy television series
BBC television sitcoms
English-language television shows